The Erosion of Sanity is the second full-length album by Canadian technical death metal band Gorguts. The album was released on January 19, 1993 through Roadrunner Records. Though it is now considered a milestone in the genre, the album's release coincided with the decline of death metal's popularity as a genre, and Roadrunner decided to drop the band from their roster. The band subsequently entered into a five-year state of limbo in which they ceased touring, during which all members except Luc Lemay left. Gorguts later returned with a new lineup, releasing their third full-length album Obscura in 1998.

The album was remastered and re-released with Considered Dead as part of Roadrunner's Two from the Vault series, in 2004. It was re-released again in 2006 with two bonus tracks.

Track listing

Personnel

Gorguts
 Luc Lemay – vocals, guitar, piano (2), logos, production
 Sylvain Marcoux – guitar, production
 Eric Giguere – bass, production
 Stephane Provencher – drums, production

Technical personnel
 Steve Harris – production, recording, engineering
 Colin Richardson – mixing
 Luc Pellerin – assistant recording
 Eddy Schreyer – mastering
 Dan Seagrave – cover concept, illustration
 Nathalie Duquette – band portrait
 Jean-Pierre Dubois – photo
 Matt Vickerstaff – 2016 reissue layout

References

1993 albums
Gorguts albums
Roadrunner Records albums
Albums produced by Colin Richardson
Albums with cover art by Dan Seagrave